The 447th Missile Squadron is an inactive United States Air Force unit.  It was last assigned to the 321st Missile Group, stationed at Grand Forks AFB, North Dakota

The 447 MS was equipped with the LGM-30G Minuteman III Intercontinental ballistic missile (ICBM), with a mission of nuclear deterrence.  With the end of the Cold War, the 447th was inactivated on  30 September 1998.

History

World War II

Activated in mid-1942 as a North American B-25 Mitchell medium bomber squadron, it was trained by the Third Air Force in the southeastern United States. It deployed to the Mediterranean Theater of Operations, being assigned to the Twelfth Air Force in Algeria in early 1943.  While in North Africa, the squadron engaged primarily in support and interdictory operations, bombing marshalling yards, rail lines, highways, bridges, viaducts, troop concentrations, gun emplacements, shipping, harbors and other objectives.

The squadron also engaged in psychological warfare missions, dropping propaganda leaflets behind enemy lines. It took part in the Allied operations against Axis forces in North Africa between March and May 1943, the reduction of Pantelleria and Lampedusain islands during June, the invasion of Sicily in July and the landing at Salerno on the Italian mainland in September. The squadron was also involved in the Allied advance toward Rome during January–June 1944, the invasion of Southern France in August 1944 and the Allied operations in northern Italy from September 1944 to April 1945.

On 11 November 1944 the aircraft pictured (right) was part of an 18 aircraft formation which attacked three enemy troop convoys and dropped fragmentation bombs on them while attempting to move though the Brenner Pass. The aircraft was hit by ground fire and about 60% of its right vertical tail was blown off. However, the Mitchell was able to return to its base on Corsica with only a single working rudder.

The squadron was inactivated in Italy after the German capitulation in September 1945.

Air Force reserve

The squadron was reactivated as part of the reserve in 1947 and equipped with Douglas A-26 Invader light bombers, then inactivated in 1949 due to budget cuts.

Strategic Air Command

Strategic bomber operations
It was reactivated in 1953 as a Strategic Air Command (SAC) Boeing B-47 Stratojet squadron. It trained in air-to-air refueling and strategic bombardment operations with the B-47. In 1961, the squadron began transferring its B-47s to other SAC wings and became non-operational as part of the phaseout of the Stratojet.

Intercontinental ballistic missile operations
On 1 November 1963 the 447th Strategic Missile Squadron  was organized as a SAC LGM-30F Minuteman II intercontinental ballistic missile wing. It was organized on 1 February 1965, and was the first unit to place the Minuteman II on alert status in January 1966.  It became fully operational on 7 December 1966, with a complement of 50 missiles. It participated in Project Long Life II, a unique reliability test in which modified Minuteman missiles were fueled to travel a few hundred yards. The first launch from a silo occurred on 19 October 1966 and was declared unsuccessful. Nine days later, a second attempt also failed. A third attempt under Project Giant Boost occurred in August 1968 and again proved unsuccessful.

The squadron converted to LGM-30G Minuteman III missiles from December 1971 to March 1973. These missiles represented a significant technological advance, having multiple independently targetable reentry vehicles (MIRVs). Coordinating the missile changeover required complex planning and execution.

With the restructuring of the Air Force and the disestablishment of SAC in the early 1990s, the squadron was reassigned to Air Combat Command (ACC) in 1992 and then came under Air Force Space Command (AFSPC) in 1993.

In March 1995, the Base Realignment and Closure Commission selected the 321st Strategic Missile Wing for inactivation. The squadron was ordered to securely transfer its alert responsibilities to the 341st Missile Wing at Malmstrom Air Force Base, Montana. It maintained nuclear alert until inactivated in 1998, nearly 40 years after it first went on alert.

Lineage
 Constituted as the 447th Bombardment Squadron (Medium) on 19 June 1942
 Activated on 26 June 1942
 Redesignated 447th Bombardment Squadron, Medium on 6 March 1944
 Inactivated on 12 Sep 1945
 Redesignated 447th Bombardment Squadron, Light on 26 May 1947
 Activated in the reserve on 29 June 1947
 Inactivated on 27 June 1949
 Redesignated 447th Bombardment Squadron, Medium on 25 November 1953
 Activated on 15 December 1953
 Discontinued, and inactivated on 25 October 1961
 Redesignated 447th Strategic Missile Squadron (ICBM-Minuteman) and activated on 1 November 1963 (not organized)
 Organized on 1 February 1965
 Redesignated 447th Missile Squadron on 1 September 1991
 Inactivated on 30 September 1998

Assignments
 321st Bombardment Group, 26 June 1942 – 12 September 1945
 321st Bombardment Group, 29 June 1947 – 27 June 1949
 321st Bombardment Wing, 15 December 1953 – 25 October 1961
 Strategic Air Command, 1 November 1963 (not organized)
 321st Strategic Missile Wing, 1 February 1965
 321st Operations Group, 1 September 1991
 321st Missile Group, 1 July 1994 – 30 September 1998

Stations

 Barksdale Field, Louisiana, 26 June 1942
 Columbia Army Air Base, South Carolina, c. 1 August 1942
 Walterboro Army Air Field, South Carolina, 18 September 1942
 DeRidder Army Air Base, Louisiana, 2 December 1942 – 21 January 1943
 Oujda Airfield, Algeria, 7 March 1943
 Ain M'lila Airfield, Algeria, 12 March 1943
 Souk-el-Arba Airfield, Tunisia, 1 June 1943
 Soliman Airfield, Tunisia, 8 August 1943
 Grottaglie Airfield, Italy, 3 October 1943

 Amendola Airfield, Italy, c. 25 November 1943
 Vincenzo Airfield, Italy, 14 January 1944
 Gaudo Airfield, Italy, 18 February 1944
 Solenzara Airfield, Corsica, 3 May 1944
 Falconara Airfield, Italy, c. 9 May 1945
 Pomigliano Airfield, Italy, c. August – 12 September 1945
 Lunken Airport , Ohio, 29 June 1947 – 27 June 1949
 Pinecastle Air Force Base (later McCoy Air Force Base), Florida, 15 December 1953 – 25 October 1961
 Grand Forks Air Force Base, North Dakota, 1 February 1965 – 30 September 1998

Aircraft

 North American B-25 Mitchell, 1942-1945
 Boeing B-47 Stratojet, 1953-1961
 LGM-30 Minuteman, 1965-1998
447th Missile Squadron Launch Facilities
 Missile Alert Facilities (F-K flights, each controlling 10 missiles) are located as follows:
 F-00 6.3 mi E of Lawton ND, 
 G-00 5.3 mi SW of Fordville ND, 
 H-00 5.1 mi N of Michigan ND, 
 I-00 6.6 mi ExNE of Tolna ND, 
 J-00 6.0 mi SW of Brocket ND,

See also

 List of United States Air Force missile squadrons

References

Notes
 Explanatory notes

 Citations

Bibliography

External links
 Grand Forks AFB Minuteman Missile Site Coordinates

447